(yr: sim.ui), also called Deep garment in English, means "wrapping the body deep within the clothes" or "to wrap the body deep within cloth". The , along with its components, existed prior to the Zhou dynasty and appeared at least since the Shang dynasty. The  was then developed in Zhou dynasty with a complete system of attire, being shaped by the Zhou dynasty's strict hierarchical system in terms of social levels, gender, age, and situation and was used as a basic form of clothing. The  then became the mainstream clothing choice during the Qin and Han dynasties. The  later gradually declined in popularity around the Wei, Jin, and Northern and Southern dynasties period. However, the 's influence persisted in the following dynasties. The  then became a form of formal wear for scholar-officials in the Song and Ming dynasties. Chinese scholars also recorded and defined the meaning of  since the ancient times, such as Zhu Xi in the Song dynasty, Huang Zongxi in the Ming dynasty, and Jiang Yong in the Qing dynasty.

The  was also introduced in both Goryeo and Japan, where it exerted influences on Confucian clothing attire in Korea and Japan. The  is called  in Korean, it was worn by followers of Confucianism in the Goryeo and Joseon period.

Terminology 
The term  is composed of two Chinese characters《》which can be translated as 'deep' and《》which literally means 'clothing' in the broad sense. Combined, the term  literally means "deep clothing".

Construction and designs 

The structure of the  system is typically composed of upper and lower parts; it also typically comes into two styles: one-piece garment (where the upper and lower parts are connected together), and two-pieces garments (where the upper and lower parts are not connected).

Moreover, a standard  was also made up of twelve panel of fabric which were sewn together.

History of early development 
The , along with its components, already existed prior to the Zhou dynasty having first appeared at least since the Shang dynasty. However, in the Shang and Western Zhou dynasties, people prominently wore a set of attire called , which consisted of a jacket called  and a long skirt called . The  eventually became the dominant form of  robe from the Zhou dynasty to the Han dynasty remaining popular; From the Spring and Autumn period to the Han dynasty, the loose  with wide sleeves was fashionable amongst the members of the royal families, the aristocrats, and the elites. The loose  which wrapped around the body to back and lacked a front end slit and was designed for the upper classes of society, especially for women, who wanted to avoid exposing their body parts when walking. The preoccupation of the elites with layered, loose-fitting clothing also displayed their desire to distance themselves from the labourers, signalling their high status. By the Han dynasty, the  had evolved in forms; it then further developed in the Han dynasty where small variations in styles and shapes appeared. Following the Han dynasty, the  lost popularity in the succeeding dynasties until it was revived again the Song dynasty.

Zhou dynasty period 
The Western Zhou dynasty had strict rules and regulations which regulated the daily attire of its citizen based on their social status; these regulations also governed the material, shape, sizes, colours, and decorative patterns of their garments. The  was also shaped by the Zhou dynasty's hierarchical system based on social class, gender, age, and the situation.

Spring and Autumn period and Warring States period 
In the early Eastern Zhou dynasty period, there were still strict rules and regulations which regulated the clothing of all social classes and were used to maintain social distinction between people of different classes. 

The  which was representative of the Warring States Period, was designed to have the front stretched and wrapped around the body several times. The wrapping-style  for men and women can be seen in the Silk painting depicting a man riding a dragon and the Silk painting with female figure, dragon and phoenix patterns respectively Both paintings unearthed from a Chu tomb, Warring States period, 5th century BC, Changsha, Hunan Province.

It was worn by both the literati and the warriors as it was both functional and simplistic in style.

Rules and regulations in the  
The design features of  also match the ancient Chinese culture.

It also prescribed the rules on the colours and decorations of the trims based on the circumstances of its wearer:

There are two purposes for the loose-cut design: firstly, the body shape is less visible to others; the second reason is to allow the wearer to move the body as freely as possible. The wearer's skin should be appropriately covered to meet the first purpose. The waistband should only accentuate the outline of the waist; the outline of the rest of the body should be well hidden from view. Nonetheless, the second purpose, which engages more freedom of movement for the wearer's body.

Cultural significance and symbolism 

The terms "squareness," "straightness," and "evenness" can be used to describe both the physical properties of objects and the moral qualities of people. These wordplays tie the physical properties of tools to virtues. Every part of  has the attributes of an instrument, which gives the text multiple moral meanings.

The circular shape of the cuffs allows the user to raise his arms while walking, allowing him to maintain correct comportment. The straight seams worn in the rear and the square neckline worn in the front are intended to straighten one's approach to political issues. The bottom edge is meant to seem like a steelyard balance to calm one's thoughts and focus one's aim.

When attention to political matters, the wearer of the  will be straight in the sense of becoming "upright" the design of the square-shaped neckline indicates "making correct" correspondence to the wearer's role performance. The evenness of the bottom edge is supposed to be able to keep the wearer's thoughts "even" in the sense of "balancing," allowing him to focus on a single goal.  emphasizes how each part of  represents a moral trait, such as selflessness, straightness, and evenness.

Nevertheless, the chapter 《深衣》also emphasizes the body effects on wearers. The body concealing and physical movement freedom are two significant reasons why  was made in this design. In early Confucian ethics, having refined body comportment is regarded ethically significant. The  allows the user to cultivate a person's comportment while also cultivating one's character by allowing a broad range of body mobility.

Both the Chinese verbs "to carry" and "to embrace" employed regarding the straight seams and square-shaped neckline frequently indicate a close bodily relationship between its subject and object. These two words are widely used to describe how the human body moves. The text implies that the wearer's body carries and embraces the straightness and squareness. Therefore, it can be sensed through the tactile sensations when the  contacts the wearer's skin. Moreover, the evenness of the bottom border of the  may be sensed when the wearer stretches it with his hands or when his thighs naturally meet it while walking. The users of  may need to walk smoothly and firmly to keep its bottom edge even.

The design of the  also encourages its wearer to use their bodies in a certain way. The fact that the text alternates between explaining the moral characteristics that the  represents and discussing how it links to the wearer's body indicates that the design of  has considered both the physiological and psychological-cognitive effects it has on its wearer.

Mid-warring states period 

By the Mid-warring states period, however, the rules and regulations started to disintegrate. This can be observed in the  tombs, where a lady, who was a member of the  class, was buried sometimes around the year 340 – 278 BC with twelve long robes which were all cut in the approximate style of  whether they were padded with silk floss, single in layer or lined. The forms of these , however, were not standardized and show variations in cut and construction. The  found in the  tombs had a straight-front which falls straight down.

Transition from Warring States period to the Han dynasty 
The  grew in popularity during the transition period from the Warring States period to the Western Han dynasty; and with its increased in popularity, the shape of the  deviated further from its earlier prescriptions. During the Qin and Han dynasties, the  dominated the connection method of the upper and lower parts and became the mainstream choice.

Qin dynasty 

In the Qin dynasty, Qin Shi Huang abolished the -system of the Zhou dynasty and implemented the -system specifying that third ranked officials and above were required to wear  made out green silk while commoners had to wear  which were white in colour. This system adopted by Qin Shi Huang laid the foundations of the -system in the succeeding dynasties.

Han dynasty 

The Western Han dynasty also implemented the -system, which featured the use of a cicada-shaped hat, red clothes, and a collar in the shape of  《》, and garments which were sewn in the -style with an upper and lower garment sewed together.
By the Western Han Dynasty, the shape of the  had deviated from the earlier versions as it can be found in the  tomb of the same period belonging to Lady Dai. These two robes differed from each other based on their front opening and the way their lapels overlapped: the  would curve and wraps the dress to the back while the front opening of the  would fall straight down. The  directly evolved from the wrapping-style  which was worn in the pre-Qin period and became popular in the Han dynasty.  

In the early Western Han, some women wore body-hugging  which was floor length with wide and long sleeves, long enough to cover the hand. Others wore  with a flowing extended panels which would create a tiered effects at the back. However, when the  first appeared, it was considered to be improper to use it as a ceremonial garment; it was also improper to use it outside of the house, and it was also improper to wear it at home when receiving guests. The , however, were only popular for some people of certain occupations, such as warriors, servants, and the lower class, in the Han dynasty and was not widely used by the general population as it was not easily accepted by the traditional etiquette of the Han culture. In the Eastern Han dynasty, very few people wore .

History of later development

Song dynasty 

In the Song dynasty, Neo-Confucian philosophies determined the conduct code of the scholars which then had a great influence on the lives of the people. Zhu Xi and his Neo-Confucian colleagues developed a new cosmology, moral philosophy, and political principles based on intellectuals and elites sharing responsibility for the dynasty's management.

In his 《朱子家禮》, Zhu Xi described the style of the long garment in considerable detail. However, the shenyi used as a scholar gown was not popular in the Song dynasty and was even considered as "strange garment" despite some scholar-officials appreciated it. Zhu Xi himself hesitated to wear it in public due to the social stigma which were associated to it; Zhu Xi was also accused for wearing strange garments by Shi Shengzu, who also accused Zhu Xi's followers of defying the social conventions. Sima Guang, on the other hand, had the habit to wear the shenyi in private in his garden.

According to philosopher and ancient scholar Lü Dalin (1044–91), noblemen and scholars used the shenyi for informality and ease, whereas commoners wore it as formal clothing. The garment was worn by court officials, noblemen and noblewomen, palace ladies, scholars and their wives, artisans, merchants, and farmers. It was the traditional informal attire of the ancient nobility. The robe became the formal clothing of commoners in the ancient Chinese world, reversing this reasoning. The Song Neo-Confucians praised the robe not only for its elegance and simplicity but also because it represented an essential political function. In the Song dynasty, the shenyi was made with white fabric.

Ming Dynasty 
In the Ming dynasty, in line with the attempt of the Hongwu Emperor to replace all the foreign clothing used by the Mongols of Yuan, with the support of the Chinese elites who had supported the military campaigns against the Mongols. The Ming dynasty court thus gave many court commissions to the scholars who then helped enshrine Neo-Confucianism which was exemplified by Zhu Xi's 《朱子家禮》as the orthodoxy of the Ming dynasty leading to the sudden rise in popularity of the Confucian shenyi.  This form of shenyi had suddenly become a popular form of robe for the scholars in 1368 and also became the official attire of the scholars. Moreover, the shenyi had become a symbol of status and Han ethnicity as it was devoid of all foreign influence and also denoted Chinese intellectual pride and superiority.

Transition period between the Ming and Qing dynasties 
The scholar robe's shenyi was a significant topic during the transition period between the Ming dynasty and the Qing dynasty. Huang Zongxi chose Huang Runyu's research version to serve as his contrast. According to Huang Zongxi's research, the scholar's robe shenyi represented the transfer of literati political values instead of dynastic politics and imperial orthodoxy. He said that the scholar's robe's style and function exactly matched the "great implication" (da yi) of literati values. Identifying the specific portion known as ren is the main distinction between these two versions. Ren was casually marked in the center of Huang Runyu's rendition and referred to the entire front piece, folding over the other side. The robe's expanded bottom, known as xuren, was fashionable throughout the Ming dynasty and can be seen in numerous Ming paintings.

On the other hand, Huang Zongxi called ren the collar on the right folding to the left. This definition of ren is narrow and particular, referring to the collar that runs from the neck to the ground. The phrase xuren (continuing the ren) in Records of Rituals refers to the continuance of the collar. Xuren is no longer a name for a robe portion but rather a description of how ren is tailored, according to Huang Zongxi.

Late 19th century to early 20th century 
In the 19th century, some members of the gentry class still regarded the shenyi as a Chinese symbol and as having a proper status in society. The Catholic missionaries in the 19th century who visited China perceived Chinese religions (being constituted of the sanjiao) as a degeneration of "true monotheism", widespread superstition, and idolatry while the Protestant missionaries perceived them as being religions with corrupted priesthood, mindless ritualism and idolatry in the Buddhist and Taoist worship. The missionaries also viewed Christianity as being a higher civilizing force than Confucianism. However, this view was not accepted by all the Chinese people, such as Kang Youwei and Cheng Huanzhang.

Kang Youwei, who was an influential advocate of reforms in late Qing dynasty to the early Republican period, rejected the idea that Confucianism was defective when compared to Christianity. Kang Youwei thus wrote a controversial book in 1897, called 《 孔子改制考》(lit. 'Confucian robe'). 

Cheng Huanzhang, who was the founder of the Confucian Religion Association (Kongjiao hui 孔教會) in 1912 and also established the zongsheng hui (宗圣会) in Gaoyao in Guangdong, aimed to bring advocates together for the restoration of Confucian texts to the educational curriculum and the official recognition of Confucianism as China's national religion. However, despite the support of the prominent literati following the opening of the Kongjiao hui, which had also become the most illustrious and influential organization of its time, the parliament voted to not accord an official recognition to Confucianism as a ‘religion’ in both 1913 and 1916; the parliament gave official institutional status to five religions: Buddhism, Daoism, Catholicism, Protestantism, and Islam, and excluded Confucianism.

21st century 

The  reappeared in the 21st century in China. The ancient-style shenyi in the form of both qujupao and the zhijupao reappeared and is worn by both men and women. In 2003, a man named Wang Letian wore a DIY  on the streets.

Types and styles

-style

Standard  
The  was a robe which was long enough to cover the ankles of its wearer; it has an overlapping front lapel which closed on the right side in a style called ; however, its right front piece was cut as a triangular front piece that crossed in front of the body and has rounded under hem. The  would curve and wraps the dress to the back of its wearer allowing the contrasting or decorative edging of the robe would create a spiralling effect when encircling the body.

The  is characterized by overlapping curved front lapel which is elongated enough to spiral around the entire body. It typically has a silk belt which is tied closely around the waist and hips to prevent the garment from loosening; the position of the belt depends on the length of the garment. The  can have narrow sleeves or broad and loose sleeves.

-style

Standard  

The front opening of the  would fall straight down instead of having a curving front.

Confucian shenyi 
The  in later dynasties directly descended from the  worn in earlier dynasties The  was originally made of ramie cultivated in China. Ramie fabric needs to be bleached and produced 45 to 60 centimetre wide textile.

Similarly to the  worn from Zhou to Han dynasties, the shenyi designed in Song dynasty followed the same principles. The yi (衣, blouse) and chang (裳, skirt) of the shenyi is sewn together. The upper part is made up of 4 panels of ramie fabric, representing four seasons of a year. 2 panels are fold and sewn to cover the upper body. Another 2 panels of ramie fabric are sewn onto each side of the yi as two sleeves. The lower part is made up of 12 panels of fabric sewn together (十二片縫合), representing 12 months a year. Its sleeves are wide with black cuff. It is also tied with a wide belt called dadai (大帶) is tied in the front. According to the Japanese scholar Riken Nakai's shenyi template, there are four design features of the Shenyi dressing: upper and lower connections, square collar, length to the ankle, and additional coverage. In the Song dynasty, the shenyi was made with white fabric.

Diyi 
The Diyi was a set of attire which was worn as ceremonial clothing; a shenyi was also part of the diyi.

Influences and derivatives

Korea 

In Korea, the shenyi is called simui. It was introduced from China in the middle of Goryeo; however, the exact date of its introduction is unknown. The simui was worn as an outer garment by the seonbi. The seonbi in Joseon imitated the clothing attire designed by Zhu Xi, i.e. the shenyi and the literati hat. The seonbi, who valued the simui greatly, embraced it as a symbol of Confucian civilization, and continued to publish treatise on the simui starting from the sixteenth century AD. The simui also influenced other clothing, such as the cheollik, the nansam, and hakchangui.

The simui is white and in terms of design, it has wide sleeves and is composed on an upper and lower part which is attached together (衣裳連衣; Uisangyeonui) at the waistline; the lower part has 12 panels which represents 12 months. It is a high-waist robe and a belt (大帶; dadae) is tied to the simui. There were also various forms of simui which developed in the Joseon.

Japan 

The early Tokugawa period in Japan, some Japanese scholars, such as Seika Fujiwara and Hayashi Razan, who self-proclaimed themselves as followers of Zhu Xi wore the Confucian  and gave lectures in it. 

Seika Fujiwara, was usually perceived as the patriarch of the Japanese Neo-Confucian movement during the Tokugawa period. Seika used to be a Buddhist monk before turning to Confucianism and probably renounced Buddhism in the year 1594.

Vietnam 

In the Le dynasty, there were some ancient statues left behind, showing Confucian scholars wearing shenyi. But shenyi was not only worn by Confucian scholars; it was also commoners. Until the Nguyen dynasty, shenyi was still seen in a number of photos.

Similar looking garments 

 Daopao
 Paofu
 Tieli
 Zhiduo

See also
Hanfu
List of Hanfu
Panling lanshan

Notes

References

External links 

Chinese traditional clothing